was a Japanese naval aviator and flying ace ("Gekitsui-O") of the Imperial Japanese Navy during World War II. Sakai had 28–64 aerial victories, including shared ones, according to official Japanese records, but his autobiography, Samurai!, which was co-written by Martin Caidin and Fred Saito, claims 64 aerial victories.

Early life
Saburō Sakai was born on 25 August 1916 in Saga Prefecture, Japan. He was born into a family with an immediate affiliation to the samurai and their warrior legacies. Their ancestors were themselves samurai and had taken part in the Japanese invasions of Korea (1592–1598) but were later forced to take up a livelihood of farming after haihan-chiken in 1871. He was the third-born of four sons (his given name literally means "third son") and had three sisters. Sakai was 11 when his father died, which left his mother alone to raise seven children. With limited resources, Sakai was adopted by his maternal uncle, who financed his education in a Tokyo high school. However, Sakai failed to do well in his studies and was sent back to Saga after his second year.

On 31 May 1933, at the age of 16, Sakai enlisted in the Imperial Japanese Navy as a Sailor Fourth Class (Seaman Recruit) (四等水兵) at the Sasebo Naval Base. Sakai described his experiences as a naval recruit:

"The petty officers would not hesitate to administer the severest beatings to recruits they felt deserving of punishment. Whenever I committed a breach of discipline or an error in training, I was dragged physically from my cot by a petty officer. 'Stand tall to the wall! Bend down, Recruit Sakai!' he would roar. 'I am not doing this because I hate you, but because I like you and want you to make a good seaman. Bend down! And with that he would swing a large stick of wood and with every ounce of strength he possessed would slam it against my upturned bottom. The pain was terrible, the force of the blows unremitting." "There was no choice but to grit my teeth and struggle desperately not to cry out. At times I counted up to forty crashing impacts into my buttocks. Often I fainted from the pain. A lapse into unconsciousness constituted no escape however. The petty officer simply hurled a bucket of cold water over my prostrate form and bellowed for me to resume position, whereupon he continued his 'discipline' until satisfied I would mend the error of my ways."

After completing his training the following year, Sakai graduated as a Sailor Third Class (Ordinary Seaman) (三等水兵). He then served aboard the battleship  for one year. In 1935, he successfully passed the competitive examinations for the Naval Gunners' School. Sakai was promoted to Sailor Second Class (Able Seaman) (二等水兵) in 1936, and served on the battleship  as a turret gunner. He received successive promotions to Sailor First Class (Leading Seaman) (一等水兵) and to Petty Officer Third Class (三等兵曹). In early 1937, he applied for and was accepted into the navy pilot training program. He graduated first in his class at Tsuchiura in 1937 and earned a silver watch, which was presented to him by Emperor Hirohito. Sakai graduated as a carrier pilot although he was never assigned to aircraft-carrier duty. One of Sakai's classmates was Jūzō Mori, who graduated as a carrier pilot and served on the Japanese aircraft carrier Sōryū by flying Nakajima B5N torpedo bombers early in the war.

Promoted to Petty Officer Second Class (二等兵曹) in 1938, Sakai took part in aerial combat flying the Mitsubishi A5M at the beginning of the Second Sino-Japanese War in 1938–1939 and was wounded in action. Later, he was selected to fly the Mitsubishi A6M2 Zero fighter in combat over China.

World War II
Southeast Asia

When Japan attacked the Western Allies in 1941, Sakai participated in the attack on the Philippines as a member of the Tainan Air Group. On 8 December 1941, Sakai flew one of 45 Zeros from the Tainan Kōkūtai (a Kōkūtai was an Air Group) that attacked Clark Air Base in the Philippines. In his first combat against Americans, he shot down a Curtiss P-40 Warhawk and destroyed two B-17 Flying Fortresses by strafing them on the ground. Sakai flew missions the next day during heavy weather.

On the third day of the battle, Sakai claimed to have shot down a B-17, flown by Captain Colin P. Kelly. Sakai, who has often been credited with the victory, was a Shotai leader engaged in this fight with the bomber although he and his two wingmen do not appear to have been given official credit for it.

Early in 1942, Sakai was transferred to Tarakan Island in Borneo and fought in the Dutch East Indies. The Japanese high command instructed fighter patrols to down all enemy aircraft that were encountered, whether they were armed or not. On a patrol with his Zero over Java, just after he had shot down an enemy aircraft, Sakai encountered a civilian Dutch Douglas DC-3 flying at low altitude over dense jungle. Sakai initially assumed that it was transporting important people and signaled to its pilot to follow him, but the pilot did not obey. Sakai descended and approached the DC-3. He then saw a blonde woman and a young child through a window, along with other passengers. The woman reminded him of Mrs. Martin, an American who occasionally had taught him as a child in middle school and had been kind to him. He ignored his orders, flew ahead of the pilot, and signaled him to go ahead. The pilot and the passengers saluted him. Sakai did not mention the encounter in the aerial combat report.

During the Borneo Campaign, Sakai achieved 13 more victories before he was grounded by illness. When he recovered three months later in April, Petty Officer First Class Sakai joined a squadron (chutai) of the Tainan Kōkūtai under Sub-Lieutenant Junichi Sasai at Lae, New Guinea. Over the next four months, he scored the majority of his victories in flying against American and Australian pilots based at Port Moresby.

A myth has been perpetuated over time but declared to be product of the imagination of Martin Caidin, the co-author of Sakai's book "Samurai." Supposedly, on the night of 16 May, Sakai and his colleagues, Hiroyoshi Nishizawa and Toshio Ota, were listening to a broadcast of an Australian radio program, and Nishizawa recognized the eerie "Danse Macabre" of Camille Saint-Saëns. Inspired, Nishizawa is said to have come up with the idea of doing demonstration loops over the enemy airfield. The next day, his squadron included fellow aces Hiroyoshi Nishizawa and Toshio Ōta. At the end of an attack on Port Moresby, which had involved 18 Zeros, the trio performed three tight loops in close formation over the allied air base. Nishizawa indicated that he wanted to repeat the performance. The following day, a lone Allied bomber flew over the Lae airfield and dropped a note attached to a long cloth ribbon. A soldier picked up the note and delivered to the squadron commander. It read (paraphrased): "Thank you for the wonderful display of aerobatics by three of your pilots. Please pass on our regards and inform them that we will have a warm reception ready for them, next time they fly over our airfield." The squadron commander was furious and reprimanded the three pilots for their stupidity, but the Tainan Kōkūtai's three leading aces felt that Nishizawa's aerial choreography of the Danse Macabre had been worth it.

Pacific Theater
On 3 August 1942, Sakai's air group was relocated from Lae to the airfield at Rabaul.

On 7 August, word arrived that US Marines had landed that morning on Guadalcanal. The initial Allied landings captured an airfield, later named Henderson Field by the Allies, that had been under construction by the Japanese. The airfield soon became the focus of months of fighting during the Guadalcanal Campaign, as it enabled US airpower to hinder the Japanese in their attempts at resupplying their troops. The Japanese made several attempts to retake Henderson Field that resulted in almost daily air battles for the Tainan Kōkūtai.

US Marines flying Grumman F4F Wildcats from Henderson Field on Guadalcanal were using a new aerial combat tactic, the "Thach Weave", which was developed in 1941 by the US Navy aviators John Thach and Edward O'Hare. The Japanese Zero pilots flying out of Rabaul were initially confounded by the tactic. Sakai described the reaction to the Thach Weave when they encountered Guadalcanal Wildcats using it:

On 7 August, Sakai and three pilots shot down an F4F Wildcat flown by James "Pug" Southerland, who had by the end of the war become an ace with five victories. Sakai, who did not know that Southerland's guns had jammed, recalled the duel in his autobiography:

They were soon engaged in a skillfully-maneuvered dogfight. After an extended battle in which both pilots gained and lost the upper hand, Sakai shot down Southerland's Wildcat and struck it below the left wing root with his 20 mm cannon. Southerland parachuted to safety.

Sakai was amazed at the Wildcat's ruggedness:

Adams scored a near miss and sent a bullet through Sakai's canopy, but Sakai quickly gained the upper hand and succeeded in downing Adams. Although Adams bailed out and survived, his gunner, R3/c Harry Elliot, was killed in the encounter. According to Sakai, that was his 60th victory.

Serious wounds
Shortly after he had shot down Southerland and Adams, Sakai spotted a flight of eight aircraft orbiting near Tulagi. Believing it to be another group of Wildcats, Sakai approached them from below and behind and aimed to catch them by surprise. However, he soon realised that he had made a mistake since the planes were in fact carrier-based bombers with rear-mounted machine guns. Despite that realisation, he had progressed too far into the attack to back off, and had no choice but to see it through.

In Sakai's account of the battle, he identified the aircraft as Grumman TBF Avengers and stated that he could clearly see the enclosed top turret. He claimed to have shot down two of the Avengers (his 61st and 62nd victories) before return fire had struck his plane. The kills were seemingly verified by the three Zero pilots following him, but no Avengers were reported lost that day.

However, according to US Navy records, only one formation of bombers reported fighting Zeros under those circumstances. That was a group of eight SBD Dauntlesses from Enterprise, led by Lieutenant Carl Horenberger of Bombing Squadron 6 (VB-6). The SBD crews reported being attacked by two Zeros, one of which came in from directly astern and flew into the concentrated fire from their rear-mounted twin  .30 AN/M2 guns. The rear gunners claimed that the Zero as a kill when it dove away in distress in return for two planes damaged (one seriously).

Whatever the case, Sakai sustained serious wounds from the bombers' return fire. He was hit in the head by a .30 caliber bullet, which injured his skull and temporarily paralyzed the left side of his body. The wound is described elsewhere as having destroyed the metal frame of his goggles and "creased" his skull, a glancing blow that broke the skin and made a furrow, or even cracked the skull but did not actually penetrate it. Shattered glass from the canopy temporarily blinded him in his right eye and reduced vision in his left eye severely. The Zero rolled inverted and descended towards the sea. Unable to see out of his left eye because of the glass and the blood from his serious head wound, Sakai's vision started to clear somewhat as tears cleared the blood from his eyes, and he pulled his plane out of the dive. He considered ramming an American warship: "If I must die, at least I could go out as a samurai. My death would take several of the enemy with me. A ship. I needed a ship." Finally, the cold air blasting into the cockpit revived him enough to check his instruments, and he decided that by leaning the fuel mixture, he might be able to return to the airfield at Rabaul.

Although in agony from his injuries Sakai managed to fly his damaged Zero in a 4 h 47 min flight over  back to his base on Rabaul by using familiar volcanic peaks as guides. When he attempted to land at the airfield, he nearly crashed into a line of parked Zeros, but after circling four times and with the fuel gauge reading empty, he put his Zero down on the runway on his second attempt. After landing, he insisted on making his mission report to his superior officer and then collapsed. Nishizawa drove him to a surgeon. Sakai was evacuated to Japan on 12 August and there endured a long surgery without anesthesia. The surgery repaired some of the damage to his head but was unable to restore full vision to his right eye. Nishizawa visited Sakai, who was recuperating in the hospital in Yokosuka hospital.

Recovery and return
After his discharge from the hospital in January 1943, Sakai spent a year in training new fighter pilots. He found the new generation of student pilots, who typically outranked veteran instructors, to be arrogant and unskilled.  With Japan clearly losing the air war, he prevailed upon his superiors to let him fly in combat again. In November 1943, Sakai was promoted to the rank of flying warrant officer (飛行兵曹長). In April 1944, he was transferred to Yokosuka Air Wing, which was posted to Iwo Jima.

On 24 June 1944, Sakai approached a formation of 15 US Navy Grumman F6F Hellcat fighters, which he had mistakenly assumed to be friendly Japanese aircraft. William A. McCormick saw four Hellcats on the Zero's tail but decided not to get involved. Despite facing superior enemy aircraft, Sakai demonstrated his skill and experience by eluding the attacks and returning to his airfield unscathed.

Sakai claimed to have never lost a wingman in combat, but he lost at least two of them over Iwo Jima.

Sakai said that he had been ordered to lead a kamikaze mission on 5 July but that he failed to find the US task force. He was engaged by Hellcat fighters near the task force's reported position, and all but one of the Nakajima B6N2 "Jill" torpedo bombers in his flight were shot down. Sakai managed to shoot down one Hellcat and escaped the umbrella of enemy aircraft by flying into a cloud. Rather than follow meaningless orders in worsening weather and gathering darkness, Sakai led his small formation back to Iwo Jima. However, according to the aerial combat report, his mission was to escort bombers to and from their targets, and in the afternoon of 24 June, Sakai joined the attack on the US task force.

In August 1944, Sakai was commissioned an ensign (少尉). He wad transferred to 343rd Air Group and returned to the Yokosuka Air Wing again.

About the same time, Sakai married his cousin Hatsuyo, who asked him for a dagger so that she could kill herself if he fell in battle. His autobiography, Samurai!, ends with Hatsuyo throwing away the dagger after Japan's surrender and saying that she no longer needed it.

Saburō Sakai participated in the IJNAS's last wartime mission by attacking two reconnaissance Consolidated B-32 Dominators on 18 August, which were conducting photo-reconnaissance and testing Japanese compliance with the ceasfire. He initially misidentified the planes as Boeing B-29 Superfortresses. Both aircraft returned to their base at Yontan Airfield, Okinawa. His encounter with the B-32 Dominators in the IJNAS's final mission was not included in Samurai!.

Sakai was promoted to sub-lieutenant (中尉) after the war had ended.

Back to civilian life

After the war, Sakai retired from the Navy. He became a Buddhist acolyte and vowed never again to kill anything that lived, even a mosquito.

Likewise, although Japan had been defeated in the Second World War with great loss of life, Sakai serenely accepted that outcome: "Had I been ordered to bomb Seattle or Los Angeles in order to end the war, I wouldn't have hesitated. So I perfectly understand why the Americans bombed Nagasaki and Hiroshima."

Times were difficult for Sakai. He had trouble finding a job, and Hatsuyo died in 1947. He remarried in 1952 and started a printing shop.

Sakai sent his daughter to college in the United States "to learn English and democracy."

Sakai visited the US and met many of his former adversaries, including Lieutenant Commander Harold "Lew" Jones (1921–2009), the SBD Dauntless rear-seat gunner (piloted by Ensign Robert C. Shaw), who had wounded him.

After a US Navy formal dinner in 2000 at Atsugi Naval Air Station at which he had been an honored guest, Sakai died of a heart attack at the age of 84.

He was survived by his second wife, Haru;/two daughters; and a son.

In popular culture

Books
Claims have been made that his autobiography Samurai! includes fictional stories, and that the number of kills specified in that work were increased to promote sales of the book by Martin Caidin. The book was not published in Japan and differs from his biographies there.

Winged Samurai: Saburo Sakai and the Zero Fighter Pilots is a 1985 book by Henry Sakaida dealing with the wartime history of Saburō Sakai.

Film
The 1976 movie Zero Pilot dramatized Saburō Sakai’s experiences as a WWII fighter pilot. In it, Sakai is portrayed by the actor Hiroshi Fujioka. The screenplay is based on Sakai's book Samurai!. 

ReferencesNotesBibliography'''

 Hammel, Eric. Carrier Clash: The Invasion of Guadalcanal & The Battle of the Eastern Solomons, August 1942. St Paul, Minnesota: Zenith Press, 2004. .
 King, Dan. The Last Zero Fighter, Firsthand Accounts from WWII Japanese Fighter Pilots. Oakland, California: Pacific Press, 2012. .
 Kodachi, Naoki. Fighters of Our Grandfathers (in Japanese). Tokyo: Kodansha Ltd., 2010.　.
 Leckie, Robert. Challenge for the Pacific: Guadalcanal: the Turning Point of the War. New York: Doubleday & Company, 1968. .
 Lundstrom, John B. The First Team and the Guadalcanal Campaign: Naval Fighter Combat from August to November 1942. Annapolis, Maryland: Naval Institute Press, 1994. .
 Mori, Juzo. The Miraculous Torpedo Squadron. Kindle Edition, 2015 .
 Ruffato, Luca and Michael J Claringbould. Eagles of the Southern Sky: The Tainan Air Group in WWII, Volume One: New Guinea. Tainan City, Taiwan: Tainan Books, 2014. .
 Sakaida, Henry. "Osprey Aircraft of the Aces No. 22 - Imperial Japanese Navy Aces 1937-45" London: Osprey Publishing, 1998. .
 Sakaida, Henry. Winged Samurai: Saburo Sakai and the Zero Fighter Pilots. Phoenix, Arizona: Champlin Fighter Museum, 1985, .
 Sakai, Saburo, Martin Caidin and Fred Saito. Samurai!. New York: Bantam, 1978. .
 Sakai, Saburo. Sakai saburo kusen kiroku, Volume 1 (in Japanese).  Tokyo: Kodansha, 1995. .
 Shores, Christopher, Brian Cull and Yasuho Izawa. Bloody Shambles: Volume One: The Drift to War to the Fall of Singapore. London: Grub Street, 1992. .
 Stafford, Edward P. The Big E: The Story of the USS Enterprise. Annapolis, Maryland: Naval Institute Press, 1962. .
 Yositake, Kori. Saburo Sakai'' (in Japanese). Tokyo: Kojinsha, 2009.　.

External links

The Last Samurai - A Detailed Look at Saburo Sakai

Memorial To Saburo Sakai 
Sakai's Saburo Sakai Is Dead at 84; War Pilot Embraced Foes
Excerpt from Samurai
WarbirdForum: An afternoon with Saburo Sakai

PBS: Secrets of the Dead
Enterprise Action Report for August 7, 1942

Japanese military personnel of World War II
Japanese naval aviators
Japanese World War II flying aces
Japanese Buddhists
1916 births
2000 deaths
People from Saga Prefecture
Imperial Japanese Navy officers